XHOMA-FM is a noncommercial radio station in Colima, Colima, licensed to Comala. Broadcasting on 102.1 FM, XHOMA carries a music format known as "Recuerdo 102.1" which is operated by Grupo Radiofónico ZER.

History
The permit for XHOMA was awarded on January 11, 2012, to Gaia FM, A.C. Gaia FM, which also owns permits for stations in Puerto Vallarta, Cancún and Playa del Carmen, signed XHOMA on late in 2013 with its Pirata FM rock music format, which also airs on its other stations.

In October 2014, XHOMA turned down a different path from its sister stations when it went off the air on October 31 in what Pirata FM officially described as a "pause". On January 17, 2015, however, 102.1 FM returned to the air, this time under the control of Grupo Radiofónico ZER, known for its operation of permit stations as part of its station portfolio. ZER also moved its studios and offices to another building.

References

Spanish-language radio stations
Radio stations in Colima
Mass media in Colima City